Antibacterial usually refers to an antibiotic, a principal type of antimicrobial agent used mainly against bacteria; it may kill or inhibit them.

Antibacterial may also refer to:

 Antiseptic, a principal type of antimicrobial agent used mainly against bacteria; it may kill or inhibit them
 Disinfectant, an agent to impair microbes in cleaning/sanitation but not taken internally as medicine; it may kill or inhibit them
 Bactericide, an agent that kills bacteria populations
 Bacteriostatic agent, an agent that does not kill bacteria populations but inhibits their growth
 Antibacterial soap, whose active ingredient may be any of the above

See also
 Antimicrobial, any agent against any type of microbe